HMS Diamond was an  in service 1874–89.

History
Diamond was built for the Royal Navy at Sheerness Dockyard and launched on 26 September 1874.

In 1875 she commissioned service for the East Indies Station, later being transferred to the China Station. In 1876, she was driven ashore on the coast of Zanzibar. She was refloated. She returned to England in 1879 and was refitted and rearmed. After refit she commissioned service on the Australia Station in October 1881. She left the Australia Station in August 1888 and returned to England. She returned to Chatham and was paid off in 1889. She was sold in August 1889.

Footnotes

Bibliography
 
 Bastock, John (1988), Ships on the Australia Station, Child & Associates Publishing Pty Ltd; Frenchs Forest, Australia.

External links
 

 

1874 ships
Ships built in Sheerness
Amethyst-class corvettes
Victorian-era corvettes of the United Kingdom
Maritime incidents in 1876